A total of 134 teams competed, split into 9 groups, in the Japanese Regional Leagues, the fifth tier of the Japanese association football league system, in 2020.  Due to the COVID-19 pandemic in Japan, all matches in all regions were changed from double round-robin into single round-robin, except Chūgoku and Tōkai.

All regional champions qualified for the Japanese Regional Football Champions League. Like the J.League, there was no relegation in this season to Prefectural Leagues (promotion and relegation between divisions were still available for some regions).

Champions list

Hokkaido

Tohoku

Division 1

Division 2

Division 2 North

Division 2 South

Kantō

Division 1

Division 2

Hokushinetsu

Division 1

Division 2

Tōkai 
Owing to the coronavirus pandemic, the Tōkai region played a knockout tournament to decide the team qualifying for the 2020 Regional Promotion Series (for Division 1 only).

In Division 1, Yazaki Valente did not participate, so Kariya received a bye to the semi-finals.

Division 1 Bracket

Division 2 Bracket

Kansai

Division 1

Division 2

Chūgoku 
Due to the coronavirus pandemic, the Chūgoku region played in a tournament known as the CSL Championship 2020, or C-1 Cup, with 8 teams competing for a spot in the 2020 Regional Promotion Series.
NTN Okayama and Dezzolla Shimane did not participate in this season.

Group stage

Group A

Group B

Knockout stage

Shikoku

Kyushu 
On August 11, the Kyushu League was abandoned, due to Kaiho Bank's withdrawal and the spread of coronavirus in Okinawa and Kumamoto. Okinawa SV, as the 2019 Kyushu League champions, are elected to play in the Regional Promotion Series.

League table at the time of abandonment

See also 
Japan Football Association (JFA)
League(s)
J.League
2020 J1 League (Tier 1)
2020 J2 League (Tier 2)
2020 J3 League (Tier 3)
2020 Japan Football League (JFL) (Tier 4)
2020 Regional Champions League (Promotion playoffs to JFL)
Cup(s)
2020 Fuji Xerox Super Cup
2020 Emperor's Cup (National Open Cup)
2020 J.League YBC Levain Cup (League Cup)

References 
RSSSF

2020
2020 in Japanese football leagues
Japan